The 1937 All England Championships was a badminton tournament held at the Royal Horticultural Halls, Westminster, England from March 1 to March 6, 1937.

Final results

Results

Men's singles

Women's singles

 Mavis Hamilton married and competed as Mavis Macnaughton

References

All England Open Badminton Championships
All England
All England Open Badminton Championships in London
1937 in badminton
March 1937 sports events
1937 in London